Superman El Último Escape (meaning "Superman: Ultimate Escape") is a steel D. H. Morgan Manufacturing roller coaster that opened at Six Flags México on November 19, 2004.

History

Superman El Último Escape was originally supposed to be open in 2002, but this was delayed when construction stopped during a two-year dispute between Six Flags and the Mexican government. Work resumed in 2004 and the ride opened on November 19 of that year.

Since opening, Superman El Último Escape, took the records for the tallest, fastest and longest roller coaster in Latin America.

On December 28, 2020, the Park's Twitter account said that the ride would close down permanently. This was later revealed to be a prank for the Day of the Holy Innocents.

Ride

Riders are taken out of the station and go through followed by a right hand turnaround, then a left curve, and a straightaway. The train then goes into a braking section, followed small pre-drop to reduce stress to the brakes, then a left hand turn that leads riders up the lift hill. Once falling down the first drop, the train will then build up seventy-five miles an hour of speed by the time it reaches the base of the pull-out fifteen feet above the ground. While riding the coaster the train will go on another  hill and two 360 degree helix's. The train then goes into a series of bunny hills followed by a brake run followed by a left hand turn that returns riders back into the station.

References

External links
Official Website

Roller coasters manufactured by Chance Morgan
Roller coasters in Mexico
Roller coasters introduced in 2004
Six Flags México
Roller coasters operated by Six Flags
Steel roller coasters
Superman in amusement parks
Warner Bros. Global Brands and Experiences attractions